VRK Tigrarna is a Swedish Rugby union team in Västerås. They play in the Mälardalsserien, the second level of rugby in Sweden.

History
The club was founded on 18 April 1948 by Karl Wolgert Nilsson, which would make them the oldest team in Sweden, thought it disbanded a number of times. After being inactive for a couple of years they reformed in 2010.

Swedish rugby union teams